Jürgen 'Kobra' Wegmann (born 31 March 1964) is a German former professional football who played as a striker.

Honours

Club
Bayern Munich
 DFL-Supercup: 1987
 Bundesliga: 1988–89

Borussia Dortmund
 DFL-Supercup: 1989
 UEFA Europa League: runner-up 1992–93

Rot-Weiss Essen
 DFB-Pokal finalist: 1994

Individual
 Goal of the Year (Germany): 1988

References

1964 births
Living people
Association football forwards
German footballers
Germany under-21 international footballers
Bundesliga players
Rot-Weiss Essen players
Borussia Dortmund players
FC Schalke 04 players
FC Bayern Munich footballers
MSV Duisburg players
Footballers from Essen
West German footballers